Salang is a district of Parwan province, Afghanistan. It is located to the southern end of the Salang Tunnel. The estimated population in 2019 was 28,856.

See also
 Districts of Afghanistan

References

Districts of Parwan Province